Jitendra Kumar is an Indian actor. He is best known for his role of Jitu in TVF Pitchers, Jeetu Bhaiya in Kota Factory, Aman Tripathi in Shubh Mangal Zyada Saavdhan, Meenu in Jaadugar, and Abhishek Tripathi in Amazon Prime's Panchayat,. He has received several awards including two Filmfare OTT Awards.

Early life and career
While studying civil engineering  at IIT Kharagpur, Jitendra Kumar started liking acting. Kumar has done many stage plays as the Governor of the Hindi Technology Dramatics Society at the IIT where he met Biswapati Sarkar Executive Creative Director and Writer at The Viral Fever who eventually invited him to join TVF in 2012.

Kumar starred in Munna Jazbaati: The Q-tiya Intern in 2013 which instantly went viral and crossed 3 million views. Since then, he has portrayed several characters in TVF videos which includes Tech Conversations With Dad, A Day With, TVF Bachelors, Kota Factory and many others.

Apart from TVF videos on YouTube, Kumar has played a few significant roles in comedy sketches, movies and web series. He is predominantly famous for his character Jitendra Maheshwari, a frustrated corporate employee from TVF Pitchers, Gittu, a confused bridegroom from Permanent Roommates and Jeetu Bhaiya from Kota Factory. He made his film debut with Shuruat Ka Interval in 2014. 

He recently starred as the lead in the web-series Panchayat on Amazon Prime. He plays, Abhishek Tripathi, a young urban secretary of a Panchayat office in the rural town of Phulera, Uttar Pradesh. The series produced by TVF, has been widely praised by viewers and critics alike.

In 2020, he was seen as Aman Tripathi in Shubh Mangal Zyada Saavdhan opposite Ayushmann Khurrana and then he played Billu' in Chaman Bahaar.

Filmography

Films

Web series

Awards and nominations

References

External links
 
 

Indian male comedians
Living people
IIT Kharagpur alumni
1990 births